A rig is an arrangement of items used for fishing. It can be assembled of one or more lines, hooks, sinkers, bobbers, swivels, lures, beads, and other fishing tackle. A rig might be held by a rod, by hand, or attached to a boat or pier. Some rigs are designed to float near the surface of the water, others are designed to sink to the bottom. Some rigs are designed for trolling. Many rigs are designed especially for catching a single species of fish, but will work well for many different species.

Types of rigs

North America 
 milton rig
 Chod rig
 Hair rig
 Texas rig
 Carolina rig

Oceania 

 Paternoster rig
 Running sinker rig
 Quill float rig
 Bob float rig

References 
 Combat-Fishing - Useful Fishing Rigs
 All Fishing Gear - Fishing Rigs